The Nikon F5 is a 35 mm film-based single-lens reflex camera body manufactured by Nikon from 1996 through 2004. It was the fifth in Nikon's professional film camera line, which began in 1959 with the Nikon F. It followed the Nikon F4 of 1988, which had introduced in-body autofocus to Nikon's professional line. The F5 was in turn succeeded by the Nikon F6, as well as Nikon's parallel range of professional digital SLRs, beginning with the Nikon D1.

Design
Important advances in the F5 included:
 Nikon 3-D color matrix meter (the F4 had introduced multi-segment matrix metering to the F series, but color sensing was new).
 A self-diagnostic and self-adjusting shutter.
 A mirror-balance system that reduced camera shake.
 Electronically controlled exposure times from 1/8000 second to 30 seconds.
 Built-in 8 frame per second motor drive (up from 5.7 frame/s on the F4).
 1/300 second flash sync (up from 1/250 on the F4). However, at 1/300 second, flash units could not use their full capacity.
 Full support for Nikkor AF-S and G designated lenses (the F4 could not use G lenses in aperture-priority or full manual modes).
 Support for the Vibration Reduction (VR) image stabilization feature of newer Nikkor lenses.
 Five focus points for the autofocus sensor (up from one on the F4) with intelligent dynamic autofocus mode.
 A new industrial design by Giorgetto Giugiaro (also designer of the F3 and F4).
 An integral vertical/battery grip with additional shutter release and adjustment wheel controls (previous Nikon F models had used a range of removable battery grips).

Like all previous Nikon F series cameras, the F5 maintained a manual film rewind (with a rapid power rewind built in), high durability, exceptionally short shutter lag, interchangeable 100% coverage viewfinders (including a large-view Action Finder, Waist-Level Finder, and 6x High-Magnification Finder, in addition to the stock DP-30 multi-metering pentaprism), and support for a wide range of Nikon F-mount lenses. In common with the F3 and F4 it relied upon battery power in order to function, either from eight AA batteries or an optional rechargeable NiMH battery pack.

Variants:  Nikon introduced a very limited production anniversary edition of the F5 to celebrate 50 years of Nippon Kogaku (Japanese Optical).  It featured a titanium colored top plate, grey handgrip (vice red) and a special DP-30 metering prism with its historic "Nikon" font.  On the reverse is found the original Nippon Kogaku trademark logo and a stylized "50" beneath it.  Approximately 3000 were made for the global market.  They were quickly snatched up around the world by collectors who saw the F5 as the last of the true professional grade film SLRs by Nikon. It was discontinued in 2004 as it was facing tough competition from its competitors.

Kodak digital camera conversions 

During the late 1990s, Nikon and Kodak collaborated on a range of professional digital SLRs which combined Nikon bodies with Kodak digital sensors and electronics. The initial range was based around the semi-professional Nikon F90, but the later Kodak DCS 600 and DCS 700 models were based on the Nikon F5. On a physical level they consisted of a Nikon F5 with the film transport equipment replaced with a custom-made Kodak digital back. The digital back extended beneath the camera to house the battery and a pair of PCMCIA card slots.

The Kodak DCS 600 series was launched in 1999, and initially consisted of the 2 megapixel Kodak DCS 620 and the 6 megapixel DCS 660, which had an initial launch price of $29,995. The DCS 600 series was continued in 2000 with the Kodak DCS 620x, a high-sensitivity model with an upgraded indium tin oxide sensor and a cyan-magenta-yellow Bayer filter, which had a then-unique top ISO setting of ISO 6400.

Kodak replaced the 600 series with the upgraded DCS 700 series in 2001, which consisted of the high-sensitivity DCS 720x and the 6 megapixel DCS 760. By 2001 Kodak faced competition from the popular Nikon D1 and Nikon D1x, which were physically smaller and cheaper. The DCS 760's initial list price was $8,000.

References

External links 

 Debut of the Nikon F5, by Nikon
 Comprehensive Nikon F5 site (Photography in Malaysia)

F005
F005